Walter Giffard (also Gifford) was an English medieval theologist, university vice-chancellor, and university chancellor.

In 1311, Giffard was Vice-Chancellor and Chancellor of the University of Oxford.

References

Bibliography
 

Year of birth unknown
Year of death unknown
English Roman Catholic theologians
Vice-Chancellors of the University of Oxford
Chancellors of the University of Oxford
13th-century English people
14th-century English people